Karishma Lala Sharma (born 22 December 1993) is an Indian actress and model known for portraying Ragini in Ragini MMS: Returns, Aaina in Ujda Chaman, Tina in Pyaar Ka Punchnama 2 and Isha in Hum - I'm Because of Us.

Early life
Sharma was born in Mumbai. She lived in Delhi and Patna before returning to Mumbai.

Filmography

Films

Web series

Television

Music videos

References

External links

 
 
 

1993 births
Living people
Actresses in Hindi cinema
Actresses from Mumbai
Indian film actresses
21st-century Indian actresses
People from Delhi
People from Patna
Indian television actresses
Actresses in Hindi television